Yellow-billed hornbill is a common name for several birds in the genus Tockus and may refer to one of the following:

 Eastern yellow-billed hornbill, Tockus flavirostris
 Southern yellow-billed hornbill, Tockus leucomelas

 
Birds by common name